Helper may refer to:

Places
 Helper, Utah

People with the name
 Hinton Rowan Helper (1829–1909), southern author and critic of slavery
 Joe Helper (born 1959), a Labor politician serving in Victoria, Australia

Arts, entertainment, and media
 H.E.L.P.eR., a supporting robotic character on The Venture Bros. television show
 Little Helper, a robot character in the Donald Duck universe
 The Tuna Helpers, (sometimes styled as TheTunaHelpers on albums and promotional materials), a former all-female American indie Gothic psychedelic art folk rock band based in Austin, Texas from 2000 to 2007

Food 
Betty Crocker brand packaged food "Helper" products, e.g., Asian Helper, Fruit Helper, Pork Helper, Whole Grain Helper, and:
 Chicken Helper, and Chicken and Chili Helper
 Hamburger Helper, and Hamburger Helper Microwave Singles
 Tuna Helper

Other uses
 Domestic worker or domestic helper
 Helper (Subud), a person in a supporting role within the spiritual association Subud
 Helper, one of the personality types in the Enneagram of Personality
 Helper class, a programming term
 Helper locomotive, coupled to a train to temporarily provide extra power
 Helpers at the nest, in birds
 Helper - a compact personal flotation device for providing first aid to a swimmer in case of a drowning threat